The 2004 Ladies German Open was a women's tennis event that was played in Berlin, Germany from 3 May to 9 May 2004. It was one of two Tier I events that took place on red clay in the build-up to the second Grand Slam of the year, the French Open. Second-seeded Amélie Mauresmo won the singles title and earned $189,000 first-prize money.

Finals

Singles

 Amélie Mauresmo defeated  Venus Williams, walkover

Doubles

 Nadia Petrova /  Meghann Shaughnessy defeated  Janette Husárová /  Conchita Martínez, 6–2, 2–6, 6–1

Prize money

External links
 ITF tournament edition details
 Tournament draws

Qatar Telecom German Open
Berlin
WTA German Open